Canowindra is a prehistoric lobe-finned fish which lived during the Late Devonian period (about 374 to 359 million years ago). The genus is known from only a single well preserved specimen, dubbed Canowindra grossi, after Professor Walter Gross, who spent his career studying lobe-finned fish, and after the Australian town in which it was found, Canowindra. Canowindra grossi was apparently comparatively small in size (about 50 cm) and belongs to the family of Canowindridae.

External links
 https://web.archive.org/web/20080718172910/http://ageoffishes.org.au/fishes/canowind.htm

Canowindrids
Late Devonian animals
Late Devonian fish
Devonian bony fish
Prehistoric fish of Australia
Prehistoric lobe-finned fish genera